In economics, the absence rate is the ratio of workers with absences to total full-time wage and salary employment. In the United States, absences are defined as instances when persons who usually work 35 or more hours per week worked less than 35 hours during the reference week for one of the following reasons: own illness, injury, or medical problems; childcare problems; other family or personal obligations; civic or military duty; and maternity or paternity leave.

Statistics

In 2005, workers in the education and health services sector had the highest absence rate in the private sector at 4.0 percent, while workers in natural resources, construction, and maintenance occupations and in management, professional, and related occupations had the lowest absence rates.

See also
 Bureau of Labor Statistics
 Current Population Survey

References

External links
 Absence rate in glossary, U.S. Bureau of Labor Statistics Division of Information Services

Labour economics indices
Personnel economics